Gwen is a Welsh feminine given name meaning "white, holy". It can be a shortened form of Gwenhwyfar (Guinevere) or other names beginning with the same element, such as:
Gwenhael, Gwenael, Gwenvael, Gwenaelle
Gwenda (explained as a compound of gwen "white, pure, blessed, holy" + da "good, well")
Gwendolen, Gwendoline, Gwendolyn
Gweneira (from gwen "white" + eira "snow")
Gwenfair (combination of gwen "blessed, holy" + -fair, soft mutation of Mair "(the Virgin) Mary")
Winefride (originally Gwenffrewi)
Gwenfron (from gwen "white" + fron, mutated form of bron "breast"; cf. Bronwen)
Gwenyth, Gwenith (identical to the Welsh word for "wheat")
Gwenllian
Gwennant (compound of gwen "white" + nant "stream, brook")
Gwenola (modern feminized form of Breton Winwaloe)

Although superficially similar, Gwyneth has a different, albeit uncertain, etymological origin (likely either from Gwynedd or the Welsh 'gwynaeth', meaning joy, bliss or happiness.

People
 Gwen Berry (born 1989), American hammer thrower
 Gwen Bristow (1903–1980), American author and journalist
 Gwen Davis (born 1936), American novelist
 Gwen ferch Ellis (c. 1542 – 1594), the first recorded woman accused of witchcraft in Wales
 Gwen Guthrie (1950–1999), American singer
 Gwen Harwood (1920–1995), Australian poet
 Gwen Ifill (1955–2016), American journalist
 Gwen John (1876–1939), Welsh artist
 Gwen Jorgensen (born 1986), American world and Olympic champion triathlete
 Gwen Kelly (1922–2012), Australian novelist and short-story writer
 Gwen McCrae (born 1943), American singer
 Gwen Moore (born 1951), American politician
 Gwen Plumb (1912–2002), Australian performer
 Gwen Raverat (1885–1957), English wood engraving artist
 Gwen Sebastian (born 1974) American Country-rock singer
 Gwen Shamblin, American author
 Gwen Smith, West Indian cricketer
 Gwen Somerset, (1894–1988), New Zealand educator
 Gwen Stefani (born 1969), American pop-rock, Ska and R&B singer
 Gwen Verdon  (1925–2000), American dancer and actress

Fictional characters
 Saint Gwen Teirbron (sometimes called "Blanche" in French sources)
 Gwen Choke, James Adams' deceased mother in the CHERUB novel series
 Gwen Cooper, one of the main protagonists in the television series Torchwood
 Gwen Grayson, a character in the movie Sky High (2005)
 Gwen Kindle, a character from the stop-motion series The Most Popular Girls in School
 Gwen Meighen, an air stewardess from the 1968 novel Airport and its 1970 film adaptation
 Gwen Norbeck Munson, from the TV soap opera As the World Turns
 Gwen Poole, the protagonist of the Unbelievable Gwenpool comic book series
 Gwen Raiden, from the TV series Angel
Gwen Runck, from the TV series That '90s Show
 Gwen Stacy, a love interest of Peter Parker (Spider-Man) in many of the Spider-Man comic book series
 Gwen Tennyson, from Cartoon Network's Ben 10 franchise
 Gwen West, a character from the TV sitcom Gavin & Stacey
 Gwen Hotchkiss Winthrop, from the American soap opera Passions
 Gwen Wu, a character from the Nickelodeon animated TV series The Mighty B!
 Gwen, a minor character from the American animated series Mission Hill
 Gwen, a character from the Canadian animated series Total Drama
 Gwen, a minor character from 6teen
 Gwen, a 2009 "Girl of the Year" doll from the American Girl collection
 Gwen, the recurring character from Johnny and the Sprites
 Gwen, a recurring character from Sam & Cat
 Gwen, a recurring character in the MMORPG Guild Wars, its expansion pack, and its sequel
 Gwen, the castle's kitchen maid from Sofia the First
 Gwen, a gunslinger hero in the video game Vainglory
 Gwendaline, a character from the movie Bad Moms
 Gwen (or Guinevere), from the British TV series Merlin
 Gwen, the Hallowed Seamstress, a playable champion character in the multiplayer online battle arena video game League of Legends

See also
 Saint Wenna, also known as Gwen of Talgarth
 Saint Wenna (queen), also known as Gwen ferch Cynyr

References

English feminine given names
English given names
Hypocorisms
Breton feminine given names